Lam Tsuen Country Park is a 15.20 km2 country park in the northern New Territories, Hong Kong.

It opened in 1979 and spans parts of Tai Po, Fanling and Yuen Long. The park is divided into two parts by Fan Kam Road: Tai To Yan and Kai Kung Leng.

Features include
 Yuen Long Plain
 Lam Tsuen Valley
 Sam Tin
 Liying School

Peaks include
Kai Kung Leng Range:
Lo Tin Deng (585 m)
Tai Lo Tin aka Kai Kung Leng and formerly aka Kwai Kok Shan (572 m)
Kai Kung Shan (374 m)
Tai To Yan Range:
Tai To Yan (566 m)
Pak Tai To Yan (480 m)

See also
 Conservation in Hong Kong

External links

Lam Tsuen Country Park

Country parks and special areas of Hong Kong
Lam Tsuen